Albertas Techovas (born March 28, 1980) is a Lithuanian judoka.

Achievements

References

1980 births
Living people
Lithuanian male judoka
Judoka at the 2004 Summer Olympics
Judoka at the 2008 Summer Olympics
Olympic judoka of Lithuania
Place of birth missing (living people)
21st-century Lithuanian people